Seimsgrend Station is a railway station on the Bergensbanen railway line.  It is located at Seimsgrend in Voss municipality, Vestland county, Norway. The station is served by limited number of departures by the Bergen Commuter Rail operated by Vy Tog. The station opened as part in 1936.

External links
 Jernbaneverket's page on Seimsgrend

Railway stations in Voss
Railway stations on Bergensbanen
Railway stations opened in 1936